Scream is an American meta horror slasher film series created in 1996 by Kevin Williamson and Wes Craven. Each of the films features a large ensemble of actors and actresses. The leading role of the series is Sidney Prescott, portrayed by Canadian actress Neve Campbell, who is accompanied by ambitious news reporter Gale Weathers, played by Courteney Cox, and the police officer Dewey Riley, played by David Arquette, who appear in all five Scream films. Other major recurring characters include film-geek Randy Meeks, played by Jamie Kennedy, and Cotton Weary, played by Liev Schreiber, in the first three films. The series consists of five films: Scream (1996), Scream 2 (1997), Scream 3 (2000), Scream 4 (2011) and Scream (2022), with Scream VI set to be released in 2023. The first four films were directed by Wes Craven and scored by Marco Beltrami. Kevin Williamson wrote Scream, Scream 2 and Scream 4, but scheduling commitments meant he could provide only notes for Scream 3, with writing duties instead helmed by Ehren Kruger.

The Weinstein Company stated that the success of Scream 4 could lead to potential sequels and a new Scream trilogy, with Arquette, Craven and Williamson all having been contracted or expressed interest in appearing in future installments. However, it was eventually announced the franchise would continue through Scream: The TV Series, a television production that debuted on MTV in 2015. In 2019, Spyglass Media Group acquired the rights to the series. Scream (2022) was announced in 2019, with Matt Bettinelli-Olpin and Tyler Gillett signed on to direct. Campbell, Cox, and Arquette all signed on to return for the film. 

The series is notable in the horror genre for casting established and popular actors which, before Scream (1996), was uncommon and difficult, the genre not taken seriously by mainstream actors.  In particular, its cast of famous female actresses such as Drew Barrymore and Courteney Cox in prominent, strong roles was considered to give the genre credibility and allow future Scream and other horror films to attract big name actors with greater ease.

Cast

Awards and nominations
The cast of the Scream series have won, or been nominated for, several awards, most notably Campbell who has received the most wins and nominations of the cast for her role as Sidney Prescott, including the Saturn Award for Best Actress and MTV Movie Award for Best Performance. For Scream (1996) Skeet Ulrich and Drew Barrymore received Saturn Award nominations for Best Supporting Actor. Cox received a Saturn Award for Best Supporting Actress nomination for her role in Scream 2 but lost to Gloria Stuart for Titanic (1997). Despite her brief cameo appearance as "Sidney Prescott" in the film within a film "Stab" series, Tori Spelling was nominated for a Razzie Award for "Worst New Actress" in Scream 2.

Parker Posey's role as Jennifer Jolie received near unanimous praise from critics, with the New York Times Elvis Mitchell saying "[Posey] alone makes the picture worth seeing. Dizzy and nakedly – hilariously – ambitious, she's so flighty she seems to be levitating." So well received was her performance that she received an MTV Movie Award for Best Comedic Performance nomination in 2000 for the role but lost to Adam Sandler for Big Daddy (1999).

References

Scream

Cast